Geraldine Newman (born 18 February 1934) is an English film and television actress who has acted in more than 30 television programmes and films.

Career
Newman attended drama school in Brighton. She is best known for her role as Hilda Hughes in the 1980s BBC TV series, Ever Decreasing Circles  which ran from 1984 to 1987 with an extended Christmas series finale in December 1989.

Personal life
She was married to fellow English actor David Garth, who was 14 years her senior, until his death in 1988.

Filmography

Films

Television

References

External links

1934 births
Living people
English film actresses
English television actresses
People from Brighton